The following is a list of episodes of the Japanese/Korean animated television series Scan2Go. The series premiered on September 1, 2012 at 7:00/6:00c on Cartoon Network.

for unknown reasons, the show never aired again since 2013, either the fanfare is low, an unexpected incident occurred, or because of low income/high taxes.

Episode list

Season 1 (2012–2013)

References

Scan2go
Scan2Go